Balala the Fairies: The Magic Trial (Chinese: 巴啦啦小魔仙之魔法的考驗), is a 2014 Chinese children's fantasy adventure film directed by Ren Yu and Hao Lui. It was released in China on 23 January. It is a live-action film adaptation of an animated magical girl series of the same name created by Guangzhou Toy company Auldey. It's the second film in the Balala the Fairies film series, following 2013's Balala the Fairies: the Movie. It was followed by 2015's Balala the Fairies: Princess Camellia.

Cast
 Daisy Cakes as Mei-Xue
Zhao Jinmai as Ling Mei Qi / Maggie 
 Chen Yuwei 
 Wang Hui

Reception
The film has grossed US$2.03 million at the Chinese box office.

See also
Balala, Little Fairy

References

External links
 

2010s fantasy adventure films
Chinese fantasy adventure films
2010s children's fantasy films
Chinese animated fantasy films
Films set in Beijing
Films shot in Beijing
Live-action films based on animated series
Magical girl films
2010s Mandarin-language films